Ioannis Kousoulas (born 5 January 1950) is a Greek athlete. He competed in the men's high jump at the 1968 Summer Olympics and the 1972 Summer Olympics.

References

1950 births
Living people
Athletes (track and field) at the 1968 Summer Olympics
Athletes (track and field) at the 1972 Summer Olympics
Greek male high jumpers
Olympic athletes of Greece
Place of birth missing (living people)
Mediterranean Games silver medalists for Greece
Mediterranean Games medalists in athletics
Athletes (track and field) at the 1967 Mediterranean Games
20th-century Greek people